Ricardo André may refer to:

 Ricardo André (footballer, born 1982), Portuguese football player, full name Ricardo André Duarte Pires
 Ricardo André (footballer, born 1983), Portuguese football player, full name Ricardo André Braga da Silva